The Aurora was a domestic Trans Europ Express in Italy linking Rome with Reggio di Calabria. The train was named after the Roman goddess of dawn, referring to the train's early morning departure from Rome.

Trans Europ Express
The Aurora was based on existing first-class only Rapidos running between Rome and Naples. In 1974 the service was extended to Reggio di Calabria and upgraded to Trans Europ Express. The southbound service used the schedule of Rapido 893, the northbound service the schedule of Rapido 882 already running from Reggio to Rome. Despite the scenic route along the Tyrrhenian sea between Naples and Reggio di Calabria, loading figures on this stretch were very low and consequently the Aurora was downgraded to a two-class Rapido after only 371 days as TEE on 1 June 1975. On 1 June 1980 the service was extended to Palermo using the train ferry to cross the Strait of Messina. On 30 May 1987 the rapido Aurora was withdrawn from service.

CityNightLine

Later CityNightLine revived the name for its train which services the Basel-Copenhagen route:

The stations  served by the Aurora are:

References

Works cited

Night trains
International named passenger trains
Named passenger trains of Denmark
Named passenger trains of Germany
Named passenger trains of Italy
Named passenger trains of Switzerland
Trans Europ Express
Railway services introduced in 1974